An L.A. Minute is a 2018 American comedy film directed by Daniel Adams, from a screenplay by Adams and Larry Sloman. It stars Gabriel Byrne, Kiersey Clemons, Bob Balaban, Ned Bellamy and others. It is Adams' first film after being released from prison where he spent 21 months for tax fraud related to his previous two films. The film was released in August 2018 only in three theaters. In December 2019, Adams was convicted of defrauding investors in connection to this film.

References

External links 
 

2018 comedy films
2018 films
Films directed by Daniel Adams (director)
American comedy films
2010s English-language films
2010s American films
English-language comedy films